The Dahlak Archipelago is an Eritrean island group located in the Red Sea near Massawa, Eritrea. It consists of two large and 124 small islands. The pearl fisheries of the archipelago have been famous since Roman times and still produce a substantial number of pearls.

Geography
Only four of the islands are permanently inhabited, of which Dahlak Kebir is the largest and most populated. Other islands of the archipelago are Dhuladhiya, Dissei, Dohul (Dehil), Erwa, Harat, Harmil, Isra-Tu, Nahaleg, Nakura, Nora (Norah) and Shumma, although only Nora and Dohul are permanently inhabited, besides the main island. The islands are home to a diverse marine life and sea-birds, and attract an increasing number of tourists. Residents of the archipelago speak Dahlik, and maintain a traditional way of life including fishing and herding goats and camels. The islands can be reached by boat from Massawa and are popular with scuba divers and snorkellers.

History

G.W.B. Huntingford has identified with the Dahlak archipelago a group of islands near Adulis called "Alalaiou" in the Periplus of the Erythraean Sea which were a source of tortoise shell. According to Edward Ullendorff, the Dahlak islanders were amongst the first in the Horn of Africa to embrace Islam, and a number of tombstones in Kufic script attest to this early connection.

In the 7th century, an independent state emerged in the archipelago. However, it was subsequently conquered by Yemen, then by the Ethiopian Empire. In 1517 the Ottoman Turks conquered  the islands and placed them under the rule of the Pasha at Suakin as part of the province of Habesh. By 1526 the Dahalik sultan, Ahmad, had been degraded to a tributary. There was a short revival of the sultanate during the Abyssinian-Adal war, where the sultanate of Adal waged a temporarily successful jihad against the Ethiopian Empire. Sultan Ahmad joined the Somali Adal Empire and was rewarded with the port town of Arkiko, which before the war had belonged to Medri Bahri. However, in 1541, one year after the death of sultan Ahmad, the Portuguese returned and destroyed Dahlak yet again. Sixteen years later, the islands were occupied by the Ottoman Empire again, who made them part of the Habesh Eyalet.

The Italian colony of Eritrea, formed in 1890, included the archipelago. However, during this time the islands were home to little except the Nocra prison camp operated by the Italian colonial forces.

After Ethiopia allied itself with the Soviet Union during the Cold War, following the rise of the Derg, the Dahlak Archipelago was the location of a Soviet Navy base. In 1990, Ethiopia lost control of the Dahlak Archipelago and the northern Eritrean coast to the Eritrean independence movement (EPLF) and by 1991 Ethiopia had lost control of all of Eritrea. Following the international recognition of Eritrean independence in 1993, the Dahlak Archipelago became a part of Eritrea.

Ecology
Some of the islands are fringed with mangroves and others with salt brush scrub. The coral reefs and shoals that surround the islands are rich in marine life, and many sea birds visit the area. Dolphins, dugongs, sharks and turtles can be seen as well as a great variety of invertebrates.

See also
 Sultanate of Dahlak
 Dahlak Marine National Park
 Dahalik languages

References

External links
 Dahlak – Reef pearls of the Red Sea – Dahlak Islands informative site

 
Massawa
Northern Red Sea Region
Landforms of Eritrea
Islands of the Red Sea
Archipelagoes of the Indian Ocean
Russian and Soviet Navy bases
Military installations of the Soviet Union in other countries
Ethiopia–Soviet Union relations